These are the Canadian number-one country songs of 1969, per the RPM Country Tracks chart.

See also
1969 in music
List of number-one country hits of 1969 (U.S.)

References

External links
 Read about RPM Magazine at the AV Trust
 Search RPM charts here at Library and Archives Canada

 
Country
1969